Hard Boiled is a 1919 American comedy silent film directed by Victor Schertzinger and written by John Lynch and R. Cecil Smith. The film stars Dorothy Dalton, Billy Mason, William Courtright, Gertrude Claire, Walter Hiers, and Nona Thomas. The film was released on February 2, 1919, by Paramount Pictures.

Plot

Cast
Dorothy Dalton as Corinne Melrose
Billy Mason as Billy Penrose
William Courtright as Deacon Simpson 
Gertrude Claire as Aunt Tiny Colvin
Walter Hiers as Hiram Short
Nona Thomas as Daisy May

Preservation status
A print survives in the Archives du Filmdu CNC(Bois d'Arcy) France.

References

External links

 
 

1919 films
1910s English-language films
Silent American comedy films
1919 comedy films
Paramount Pictures films
Films directed by Victor Schertzinger
American black-and-white films
American silent feature films
1910s American films